Alpha Delta may refer to:

 Alpha Delta (Dartmouth), a dormant local Greek organization at Dartmouth College, formerly a chapter of Alpha Delta Phi
 Alpha Delta (national), a small social fraternity, formerly chapters of Alpha Phi Omega, founded in 2007
 Alpha Delta (recognition), a dormant journalistic recognition society formed , which merged in  into Alpha Phi Gamma (honor society), another journalistic recognition society; see the Society for Collegiate Journalists
 Alpha Delta (sorority), a regional sorority in NY that devolved into eight similarly named local sororities after the 1954 SUNY ban on national affiliations. Each is named "Alpha Delta " with the blank being their former local designation; several, like the SUNY Oswego branch, remain active
 Alpha Delta (Washburn), a local fraternity at Washburn University in Topeka, Kansas formed in 1912, active today.